Théophile Funck-Brentano (21 August 1830 – 23 January 1906) was a Luxembourgian-French sociologist.

He was the son of Jacques Funck, a notary in Luxembourg City that lived with Charles Metz, who was witness to Funck-Bretano's birth.  He was the father of Frantz Funck-Brentano.

Literary works 
 Les sciences humaines, 1868
 La pensée exacte en philosophie, 1869
 La civilisation et ses lois, 1876
 La politique, 1897
 Les sophistes français, 1905

Notes

External links
 

Luxembourgian non-fiction writers
French sociologists
1830 births
1906 deaths
People from Luxembourg City
French male non-fiction writers
Alumni of the Athénée de Luxembourg